Events from the year 1707 in art.

Events
 Antoine Coypel becomes professor and rector of the Académie de peinture et de sculpture.
 James Thornhill begins work on the Painted Hall of the Royal Hospital for Seamen, Greenwich (completed 1727), probably having concluded work at Chatsworth House.

Paintings
 Michael Dahl – Portrait of Sir William Whetstone (probable date)
 Andrea Pozzo – Admittance of Hercules to Olympus (trompe-l'œil painting on ceiling of Liechtenstein Garden Palace, Vienna)
 Francesco Solimena – Portrait of Charles III of Habsburg
 Dirk Valkenburg – A Plantation in Suriname
 Willem van de Velde the Younger – The Gust

Births
 January 11 – Giuseppe Bonito, Neapolitan painter of the Rococo period (died 1789)
 January 28 (bapt.) – John Baskerville, typographer and craftsman (died 1775)
 February 27 – Joseph Johann Kauffmann, Austrian painter of portraits, church decorations, and castle depictions (died 1782)
 March 2 – Louis-Michel van Loo, French painter (died 1771)
 May 21 – Francisco Salzillo, Spanish sculptor (died 1781)
 July 8 – Jacques-Philippe Le Bas, French engraver (died 1783)
 September 30 – Pietro Rotari, Italian painter of portraits and altarpieces (died 1762)
 date unknown
 Joseph Badger, American portrait artist (died 1765)
 Jean-Bernard, abbé Le Blanc, French art critic and director of the official French policy in the arts (died 1781)
 William Hoare, English painter, noted for his pastels (died 1792)
 Sim Sa-jeong, Korean genre painter in the style of the Joseon period (died 1769)
 Maria Felice Tibaldi, Italian painter of portraits and historical subjects (died 1770)

Deaths
 February 16 – Hendrik Bary, Dutch engraver (born 1632)
 February 22 – Giacinto Calandrucci, Italian painter at the studio of Carlo Maratta (born 1646)
 April 2 – Gerard Edelinck, Flemish copper-plate engraver (born 1649)
 April 6 – Willem van de Velde the Younger, Dutch marine painter (born 1633)
 June 15 – Antonio Verrio, Italian painter of murals, altarpieces, master gardener, active mainly in England (born c. 1636)
 October 1 – Pierre Le Ber, portrait painter from Montreal (born 1669)
 December 24 – Noël Coypel, French painter (born 1628)
 date unknown
 Bernard Lens I, Dutch painter and writer of religious treatises (born c. 1631)
 Alessandro Mari, Italian painter of capricci and symbolical representations (born 1650)

References

 
Years of the 18th century in art
1700s in art